Miami Modernist architecture, or MiMo, is a regional style of architecture that developed in South Florida during the post-war period. The style was internationally recognized as a regionalist response to the International Style. It can be seen in most of the larger Miami and Miami Beach resorts built after the Great Depression. Because MiMo styling was not just a response to international architectural movements but also to client demands, themes of glamour, fun, and material excess were added to otherwise stark, minimalist, and efficient styles of the era. The style can be most observed today in Middle and Upper Miami Beach along Collins Avenue, as well as along the Biscayne Boulevard corridor starting from around Midtown, through the Design District and into the Upper Eastside.

The term MiMo has only recently been associated with the style. Popularity of the term is credited to Miami Beach resident Randall C. Robinson and interior designer Teri D'Amico. Principal examples of MiMo include the Fontainebleau Hotel, Eden Roc, Seacoast Towers, Deauville, and Di Lido hotels by famed architect Morris Lapidus; Norman Giller's Carillon Hotel, which was voted Miami Beach's "Hotel of the Year" in 1959; and the original Diplomat Hotel in Hollywood, Florida.

To some degree, Miami developed the style through the work of younger architects immediately after the war; they were more closely aligned with media promotions and sensationalism than older architects of the era. The region successfully transposed its extravagant resort styling to a national audience easily captivated by the area’s relative exoticism.

The area along Biscayne Boulevard is now the designated "MiMo Biscayne Boulevard Historic District" or more uniquely named "MiMo on BiBo", for "Miami Modern on Biscayne Boulevard". MiMo Historic District runs roughly from 50th Street to 77th Street along Biscayne Boulevard, although MiMo can be found in the Design District and Midtown. Many annual festivals are held to promote MiMo architecture, such as "Cinco de MiMo" a play on "Cinco de Mayo" in early May. The area is bounded by the Little River to the north, Bay Point Estates to the south, the Florida East Coast Railway to the west, and Biscayne Bay to the east.

Gallery

Partial list of MiMo buildings

Coral Sea Towers (Carlos B. Schoeppl, 1956) - 10300 W Bay Harbor Drive, Bay Harbor Islands
Miami Beach Bandshell (1961 by Norman Giller and Associates) 7275 Collins Ave - North Beach, Miami Beach
King Cole Condominium (Melvin Grossman, 1961) – 900 Bay Dr.
Biscayne Plaza Shopping Center (Robert Fitch Smith, 1953) – 7900 Biscayne Boulevard
New Yorker Boutique Hotel (Norman Giller, 1953) – 6500 Biscayne Boulevard
The Creek South Beach Motel (Originally Ankara Motel) (Reiff & Feldman, 1954) – 2360 Collins Avenue
Crystal House (Morris Lapidus, 1960) – 5055 Collins Avenue
Deauville Beach Resort, (demolished in 2022)
Deco Palm Apartments (Gilbert Fein, 1958) – 6930 Rue Versailles
Dupont Plaza Center (Petersen & Shuflin, 1957) – 300 Biscayne Boulevard Way (demolished in 2004 to give way to the EPIC Miami Residences and Hotel).
Imperial House (Melvin Grossman, 1963) – 5255 Collins Avenue
International Inn (Melvin Grossman, 1956) – 2301 Normandy Drive, Normandy Isle
Jackie Gleason House (Lester Avery, 1959) – 2232 Alton Road
Lincoln Road Mall (Morris Lapidus, 1960)
Miami Herald (Naess & Murphy, 1960) – One Herald Plaza (Demolished Aug 2014 – Feb 2015)
Pepsi-Cola Bottling Pavilion (Daverman & Associates c: 1965) – 7777 NW 41st Street
Royal York Hotel (1950), 5875 Collins Avenue (demolished prior to 2004)
Shalimar Motel (Edwin Reeder, 1950) – 6200 Biscayne Boulevard
Sinbad Motel (1953) – 6150 Biscayne Boulevard
South Pacific Motel (1953) – 6300 Biscayne Boulevard
Temple Menorah
Thunderbird Motel (Norman Giller, 1955) – 18401 Collins Avenue
Union Planters Bank (Francis Hoffman, 1958) – 1133 Normandy Drive
Vagabond Motel (Robert Swartburg, 1953) – 7301 Biscayne Boulevard (Reopened as the Vagabond Hotel in 2013)

See also

Miami Design District
Googie architecture
Midtown Miami
Upper Eastside
Wildwoods Shore Resort Historic District
Normandy Isles Historic District

References

External links 

 Vagabond Motel (Robert Swartburg, 1953)
 MiMo Historic District
 Miami Beach USA Article on MiMO Architecture with photos.
 Wides-Munoz, Laura (AP), Offbeat Miami: the Miami Modern District or MiMo, on ABC News Travel

 
American architectural styles
Modernist architecture in Florida